Eonycteris ("dawn bat") is a genus of megabats found in Asia. They are the only members of the tribe Eonycterini. Species within this genus are:

Greater nectar bat, Eonycteris major
Cave nectar bat, Eonycteris spelaea
Philippine dawn bat, Eonycteris robusta

References 

 
Bat genera
Taxa named by George Edward Dobson